Foothills School of Arts and Sciences is an independent private school in Boise, Idaho, educating EL (Early Learners Preschool) ages three and four, along with Kindergarten through ninth grade.

History
Foothills School of Arts and Sciences was founded in 1992 by Susan and John Medlin. It was the first non-sectarian independent school in Boise. Initially housed at the Boise Unitarian Fellowship, the school expanded to use all its available space by its third year of operation with K–6 students. It relocated to an 8th St. location in 1995 and then to its current 9th St. location in 2019. In 1998, a preschool program was added, funded in part by a grant from the J. A. and Kathryn Albertson Foundation. The school added a ninth grade in the 2009–2010 school year.

The school is an accredited member of the Northwest Association of Independent Schools and Cognia.

Campus
Foothills School's campus is located on 9th Street in Downtown Boise, in close proximity to the BoDo District that contains a pedestrian zone with numerous cafes and restaurants. Foothills is also within walking distance of the Idaho State Capitol Plaza, JUMP, City Center Grove Plaza, and many other historic landmarks. The Foothills campus is located near Julia Davis Park and the Boise greenbelt.

Curriculum
Foothills School of Arts and Sciences employs progressive and project-based Learning methods including socratic seminars. Teachers encourage students to think for themselves and about the world around them and to ask questions, instead of simply finding answers. The Early Learners preschool program is inspired by the Reggio Emilia approach.

References

External links
Foothills School of Arts and Sciences

Education in Boise, Idaho
Educational institutions established in 1992
Buildings and structures in Boise, Idaho
Schools in Ada County, Idaho
Private elementary schools in Idaho
Private middle schools in Idaho
1992 establishments in Idaho